The 2020 Zed Tennis Open II was a professional tennis tournament played on outdoor hard courts. It was the second edition of the tournament which was part of the 2020 ITF Women's World Tennis Tour. It took place in Cairo, Egypt between 17 and 23 February 2020.

Singles main-draw entrants

Seeds

 1 Rankings are as of 10 February 2020.

Other entrants
The following players received wildcards into the singles main draw:
  Lamis Alhussein Abdel Aziz
  Melanie Klaffner
  Ane Mintegi del Olmo
  Sandra Samir

The following player received entry using a junior exempt:
  Daria Snigur

The following players received entry from the qualifying draw:
  Georgia Crăciun
  Anastasia Gasanova
  Tereza Mrdeža
  Katarzyna Piter
  Stefania Rubini
  Sabina Sharipova
  Anastasiya Shoshyna
  Yang Yidi

The following player received entry as a Lucky Loser:
  Amanda Carreras

Champions

Singles

 Marta Kostyuk def.  Aliona Bolsova, 6–1, 6–0

Doubles

 Marta Kostyuk /  Kamilla Rakhimova def.  Paula Kania /  Anastasiya Shoshyna, 6–3, 2–6, [10–6]

References

External links
 2020 Zed Tennis Open II at ITFtennis.com

2020 ITF Women's World Tennis Tour
2020 in Egyptian sport
February 2020 sports events in Egypt